Dyspessa psychidion is a species of moth of the family Cossidae. It is found in Greece.

References

Moths described in 1871
Dyspessa
Moths of Europe